Mansfield Ski Club is a ski resort near the village of Mansfield, Ontario,  northwest of Toronto, Ontario, Canada.

Statistics 
Vertical drop: 
Number of runs: 15
Number of lifts: 7
Snowmaking coverage: 100%
Number of eateries: 4
Number of bars: 2

Lifts 
Handle Tow
Chalet Magic Carpet (longest in North America)
Javelin Chairlift
Low's Chairlift
Devil's Staircase t-bar "Banana Bar" (actually two t-bars side by side)
Summit Chairlift

Runs 
Awesome (green)
Chalet Run (green)
Hemlock (green)
Hector's Hill (blue)
Javelin (blue)
Boomerang (blue)
Gilly's Glades (blue)
Glades (black)
Low's Run (blue)
Big Tree (black)
Devil's Staircase (black)
Breenger (black)
Mouse Trap (black)
Shortcut Glades (blue)
Sully's Dream (black)
Outer Limits (black)

External links 
Mansfield Ski Club

Ski areas and resorts in Ontario